is a Japanese figure skater. He is the 2023 World Junior Champion, 2023 Four Continents champion, the 2022 Four Continents bronze medalist, and the 2021–22 Japan junior national champion.

Personal life 
Miura was born on June 8, 2005, in Tokyo, Japan. As of 2018, he is a junior high school student in Yokohama. His hobbies are watching anime and baseball matches.

Career

Early years 
Miura began skating in 2009. As the 2017 Japanese national novice champion, he was invited to skate in the gala at the 2017 NHK Trophy.

2019–2020 season 
Miura made his Junior Grand Prix debut at Latvia and finished in seventh place. At 14, he became the youngest Japanese skater to land a quadruple toe loop in international competition with a successful attempt at the event's free skate.

2020–2021 season 
Miura won the silver medal in 2020–21 Japan Junior Championships. Four days after the junior national championships, he made his Grand Prix debut at 2020 NHK Trophy and placed sixth. He was seventh at the senior national championships.

2021–2022 season 
Miura was assigned to the Grand Prix at the 2021 NHK Trophy, where he finished eighth. He called the competition "a lot of fun" and without pressure.

At the 2021–22 Japan Championships in December, Miura finished in fourth place in the senior event after winning gold in the junior event the previous month. He was named as an alternate for the Japanese Olympic team and sent to make his ISU championship debut at the 2022 Four Continents Championships and the 2022 World Junior Championships. Miura won the bronze medal at Four Continents, his first ISU championship medal, saying "I think I was able to show the world what kind of a skater I am. Of course, there were some mistakes I made, but even with the mistakes, I was able to put on a good performance and round it off as I did today, so I'm very happy."

On March 1, Miura was assigned to replace Yuzuru Hanyu at the 2022 World Championships. He was subsequently himself forced to withdraw due to a left quadriceps injury, and was replaced by Kazuki Tomono. At the time of his withdrawal, Miura indicated that he hoped to recover in time to compete at the World Junior Championships scheduled for a few weeks later in mid-April. Multiple jump errors in the short program lead to his placing twentieth in that segment with a score of 60.03. He rose to thirteenth overall after the free skate.

2022–2023 season 
Miura was invited to participate as part of Team Japan in the Japan Open following Yuma Kagiyama's withdrawal due to injury, finishing third in the men's competition while the team won gold.

Competing in the Grand Prix for his third season, and outside Japan for the first time, Miura's first assignment was the 2022 Skate America in Norwood. He unexpectedly placed first in the short program, aided by an error by pre-event favourite Ilia Malinin, and took the silver medal overall. He said that he "was in top form coming in, so I was able to do very well here." He placed first in the short program again at the 2022 Skate Canada International the following weekend, this time overtaking reigning world champion Shoma Uno and placed second in the free skate, earning his second consecutive Grand Prix silver medal. The two combined silver medals qualified Miura for the 2022–23 Grand Prix Final.

At the Final in Turin, Miura placed third in the short program despite falling on his jump combination, part of a Japanese sweep of the top three placements in that segment. He explained his error as having "panicked because my first jump was so good, and that's something I need to reflect on." He struggled in the free skate, tripling or doubling two planned quad jumps and falling on a third. He finished sixth in that segment and dropped to fifth overall. Very disappointed with the results and blaming a lack of focus, he said he hoped to "connect this frustration with the nationals and win and give it all."

Miura had a poor showing in the short program at the 2022–23 Japan Championships, falling on both of his attempted quad jumps. He placed thirteenth in that segment, well back of the leaders. He rallied in the free skate, placing second in that segment, sufficient to rise to sixth overall. As a result, he was named to compete at both the 2023 Four Continents Championships and the 2023 World Junior Championships.

At the 2023 Four Continents Championships Miura went into the event as one of the favorites for the podium along with Cha Jun-hwan of Korea, Keegan Messing of Canada, and compatriot Shun Sato. Miura had a shaky landing on his opening quad Salchow, but rallied to win the short program. After strong free skates by Sato and Messing, Miura needed to skate clean, and he did, landing all of his elements cleanly to achieve a new season's best score in the free program and overall to win the title.

Miura entered the World Junior Championships in Calgary as the favourite for the gold medal, and won the short program with a clean skate, placing five points clear of second-place Canadian skater Wesley Chiu. Referencing his poor short program at the previous year's event, he opined that he was able to "funnel that frustration into a good performance today." He went on to win the free skate by almost forty points, earning the gold medal, his second ISU championship of the year.

Programs

Competitive highlights 
GP: Grand Prix; CS: Challenger Series; JGP: Junior Grand Prix

2019–20 season to present

Earlier career

Detailed results
Small medals for short and free programs are awarded only at ISU Championships.
Current personal best scores are highlighted in bold.

Senior level

Junior level

References

External links 
 
 
 

Japanese male single skaters
2005 births
Living people
Sportspeople from Tokyo
Four Continents Figure Skating Championships medalists